Laurence Pike is an Australian drummer and electronic musician. He studied at Sydney Conservatorium of Music under Mike Nock. Pike has specialised in improvised music, "[integrating] everything from jazz to psych to ambient to ... experimental electronic".

Pike is a member of PVT (formerly Pivot) and Szun Waves (with Luke Abbott, and Jack Wyllie of Portico Quartet), a former member of Triosk, and released his debut solo album Distant Early Warning on The Leaf Label on 30 March 2018. 

The album was recorded on a drum kit and sampler in one day, and was described by All About Jazz as "a technological and spiritual jazz suite" and "a work of intense serenity".

Pike is a longstanding member of Jack Ladder & The Dreamlanders (featuring Kirin J. Callinan, Donny Benét), and regularly tours and records with Sarah Blasko, and 4AD recording artist D.D Dumbo.

Discography

Studio albums

Awards and nominations

National Live Music Awards
The National Live Music Awards (NLMAs) are a broad recognition of Australia's diverse live industry, celebrating the success of the Australian live scene. The awards commenced in 2016.

|-
| National Live Music Awards of 2016
| Laurence Pike (PVT)
| Live Drummer of the Year
| 
|-

References

Living people
Australian musicians

Year of birth missing (living people)